Nasrin Soltankhah is an Iranian politician who was a Vice President under Mahmoud Ahmadinejad from 2009 to 2013.

Education
Soltankhan received a Bachelor of Science in Mathematics (1976), a Master of Science in Mathematics (1978), and a PhD in Mathematics (1994) from Sharif University of Technology.

Career

Cabinet position
Soltankhan was appointed to the Iranian Cabinet on September 25, 2005 by President Mahmoud Ahmadinejad. She was also president of Iran's National Elites Foundation.

Center for Women and Family Affairs
Soltankhan's portfolio includes both the position as head of the Center for Women and Family Affairs (formerly called the Center for Women's Participation, or CWP) and also the position of advisor to the President on issues pertaining to women.

Soltankhan has mentioned three main points for women-related policies which the center will be focusing on.  These are, “upholding human dignity of women regardless of their gender,“ “capitalizing on women’s potentials in managerial and decision-making arenas,“ and “emphasizing on women’s key role in families.“  Soltankhah has also stated that the center is engaged in directing women’s capabilities into different social and cultural fields as well as generating jobs for them.

Political affiliation
Soltankhan is a member of the political organization called the Alliance of Builders of Islamic Iran.

City Council of Tehran
Apart from her work in the executive branch of the Iranian government, Nasrin Soltankhan was also on the City Council of Tehran having won a seat in 2003.  The term of service for her council seat ended in 2007.

See also
Persian women

References

External links
 http://www.iran-daily.com/1384/2391/html/panorama.htm
 http://www.iran-daily.com/1384/2419/html/panorama.htm
 https://web.archive.org/web/20160304031333/http://www.iranian.ws/iran_news/publish/article_9956.shtml
 https://web.archive.org/web/20160304031333/http://www.iranian.ws/iran_news/publish/article_9956.shtml
 
 http://www.mehrnews.com/en/NewsDetail.aspx?NewsID=39497

Living people
Alliance of Builders of Islamic Iran politicians
1963 births
People from Tehran
Coalition of the Pleasant Scent of Servitude politicians
Tehran Councillors 2003–2007
Presidential advisers of Iran
Female vice presidents of Iran
Vice presidents of Iran
Women vice presidents
21st-century Iranian women politicians
21st-century Iranian politicians